Jian Man-shu (born 16 October 1988) is a Taiwanese actress, screenwriter and director. She graduated from the theatre program at Taipei National University of the Arts with a major in directing.

Personal life 
Jian Man-shu married Yun Chang-lung, a hairstylist who is 10 years older, on July 7, 2017.

On July 27, 2017, Jian revealed that she is pregnant with their first child.

Filmography

Film

Television series

Directorial works

Awards and nominations

References

External links 

Jian Man-Shu at the hkmdb.com
Jian Man-Shu at the chinesemov.com

1988 births
Actresses from Taichung
Taiwanese film actresses
Taiwanese television actresses
21st-century Taiwanese actresses
Living people
Taiwanese film directors
Taiwanese screenwriters
Writers from Taichung